The Extraordinary and Plenipotentiary Ambassador of Peru to the Republic of Paraguay is the official representative of the Republic of Peru to the Republic of Paraguay.

Both countries established relations on November 13, 1858, which have continued since. During the Paraguayan War, the Peruvian Minister of Foreign Affairs, José Toribio Pacheco, made a statement defending the country in 1866.

List of representatives

References

Paraguay
Peru